The Mark Pardo Shellworks Site is an archaeological site west of Bokeelia, Florida. It is located along the eastern edge of Cayo Costa Island in Cayo Costa State Park. On May 21, 1996, it was added to the U.S. National Register of Historic Places.

The site has shell works, consisting of lines of shell deposits along the shore, and black dirt middens inland from the shells. There may also be features underwater in the adjacent black mangrove forest, dating to when the sea level was lower. The shell works are dominated by lightning whelk, with some horse conchs. Oyster, clam, conch and lightning whelk shells are also found in the middens. The shell works and middens are attributed to the Caloosahatchee culture IIA-IV period, about 500–1500. In 1992, the NRHP Registration Sheet described the Mark Pardo Shellworks as "one of the best preserved archaeological sites in the region." Since then, however, feral hogs have seriously damaged the site.

References

External links
 Lee County listings at National Register of Historic Places
 Alachua County listings at Florida's Office of Cultural and Historical Programs
 Note: above link is correct, but under wrong county of Alachua

Mounds in Florida
Native American history of Florida
Archaeological sites in Florida
National Register of Historic Places in Lee County, Florida
Shell middens in Florida